Jon William Embree (born October 15, 1965) is an American football coach and former player who is the assistant head coach and tight ends coach for the Miami Dolphins of the National Football League (NFL). He is a former head coach at Colorado. Prior to that, he was the tight ends coach for the Washington Redskins of the National Football League. As a player, he spent two seasons in the NFL with the Los Angeles Rams as a tight end until an injury ended his career. He was selected in the sixth round of the 1987 NFL Draft by the Rams, after playing college football at Colorado.

Embree previously coached for three seasons with the Kansas City Chiefs, three with UCLA, one with the Cleveland Browns and ten at Colorado.  After his playing career ended, Embree entered television broadcasting, then was asked to volunteer coach in 1991 for the Buffaloes by head coach Bill McCartney. Embree was a member of McCartney's first recruiting class as head coach in 1983. Embree was Colorado's head football coach in 2011 and 2012. He was terminated after compiling a 4-21 record including 1-11 in his final year, the worst year in school history.

Playing career
Embree attended El Camino College Compton Center in Los Angeles.

Personal life
Embree is the son of former NFL player John Embree, who was a wide receiver for the Denver Broncos in 1969 and 1970. Born in Los Angeles, Embree grew up in Colorado and graduated from Cherry Creek High School in suburban Denver in 1983. Jon and his wife Natalyn have three children, Hannah, Taylor, a former wide receiver at UCLA, and Connor, a  former wide receiver at UNLV.

Head coaching record

References

External links
 Miami Dolphins bio
 Colorado Buffaloes bio

1965 births
Living people
American football tight ends
Cleveland Browns coaches
Colorado Buffaloes football coaches
Colorado Buffaloes football players
Kansas City Chiefs coaches
Los Angeles Rams players
Tampa Bay Buccaneers coaches
San Francisco 49ers coaches
UCLA Bruins football coaches
Washington Redskins coaches
Coaches of American football from California
Players of American football from Los Angeles
Sports coaches from Los Angeles
African-American coaches of American football
African-American players of American football
Miami Dolphins coaches
20th-century African-American sportspeople
21st-century African-American sportspeople